The Directorate for Citizens Security or Dirección de Seguridad Ciudadana is a branch of the Colombian National Police, currently led by Operative Director Brigadier General Luis Alberto Gómez, controls strategic police services in cities, metropolitan areas, police departments and decentralized units.. It was formerly known as the Direccion Operativa or Operations Directorate. The Directorate for Citizens Security is responsible for the general supervision of the 8 National Police regions

Organization

Units under command
 Hydrocarbons Group
 Colombian National Police Special Operations Command
 Highway Police
 Mobile Anti-Disturbance Squadron
 Citizens Security
 Community Management

The Carabinier Mobile Squads have been moved to the Directorate of Carabineers and Rural Security

References

External links
Policia Nacional de Colombia

Colombian National Police Directorate for Citizens Security